Coccothrinax litoralis, the Cuban silver palm, is a palm which is endemic to Cuba.

Henderson and colleagues (1995) considered C. litoralis to be a synonym of Coccothrinax argentata.

References

litoralis
Trees of Cuba
Plants described in 1939